Assaf may refer to:

 Assaf (name), a given name and surname
 Assaf (sheep), a breed from Israel
 Academy of Science of South Africa (ASSAf)
 Book of Assaf, the earliest medical book written in Hebrew
 Operation Assaf, an Israeli operation during the 1948 Arab-Israeli War

See also
 Saint Asaph (died 601), Welsh Roman Catholic saint and bishop
 Asaf, includes a list of people with the name